Kiyoshi Tanabe (田辺 清, born October 10, 1940) is a retired Japanese boxer who won a bronze medal at the 1960 Olympics.

Biography
As an amateur Tanabe won a bronze medal at the 1960 Olympics, becoming the first Japanese boxer to win an Olympic medal. His amateur record was 115-5 (30RSC). He made his professional debut in 1963, and won the Japanese flyweight title in 1965, which he defended twice before vacating. In February 1967, he fought WBA & WBC flyweight champion Horacio Accavallo in a non-title match, and won by 6th-round TKO.

Tanabe was scheduled to get his first world title shot in July 1967, and expectations heightened around the talented fighter. However, it was discovered that he had suffered a detached retina in his right eye, which forced him into retirement. He had surgery on his right eye, but lost his vision two years later.

References

1940 births
Living people
Flyweight boxers
Olympic bronze medalists for Japan
Boxers at the 1960 Summer Olympics
People from Aomori (city)
Olympic boxers of Japan
Olympic medalists in boxing
Asian Games medalists in boxing
Boxers at the 1962 Asian Games
Japanese male boxers
Medalists at the 1960 Summer Olympics
Asian Games gold medalists for Japan

Medalists at the 1962 Asian Games